Călin Dan (born 1955 in Arad, Romania) is a Romanian artist, theorist and curator based in Amsterdam, Netherlands. Member of the subREAL artist duo together with Josif Kiraly. As a curator, Călin Dan has produced numerous exhibitions and was appointed director of the Soros Foundation's Center for Contemporary Art in Bucharest in 1992.

References

External links
Emotional Architecture
Călin Dan interviewed by Geert Lovink
The Context Network
SubReal
Călin Dan in the Video Data Bank

1955 births
Living people